Arnold Pinnock (born 1967) is a Canadian actor who is perhaps best known for his appearance as Paul Greebie, Casey's guidance counselor, in Life with Derek.

Pinnock was born in Birmingham, England. His career began with sketch comedy at Toronto's Second City Mainstage before he moved on to television and film.

He created, wrote, starred in and produced the 2022 CBC and BET series The Porter, about the railway sleeping car porters who created North America's first Black labour union, the Brotherhood of Sleeping Car Porters.

Filmography

Film

Bless the Child (2000) as Alley Officer
Bait (2000) as Convict
Apartment Hunting (2000) as Dean
Judgment (2001)
XChange (2011) as Dickerson
Down to Earth (2001) as Joe Guy
Judgment (2001) as David Sands
Exit Wounds (2001) as Alan Morris
Paid In Full (2002) as Wiry Man
Cypher (2002) as Pilot In Mensroom
Against the Ropes (2004) as Heavyweight
New York Minute (2004) as Big Shirl's Male Beautician
Assault on Precinct 13 (2005) as Carlyle
Left Behind: World at War (2005) as Bruce Barnes
Get Rich or Die Tryin (2005) as Detective #2
Lars and the Real Girl (2007) as Baxter
P2 (2007) as Cop #2
The Incredible Hulk (2008) as Soldier #2
The Echo (2008) as Officer Cole
The Cry of the Owl (2009) as Detective Anderson
Dog Pound (2010) as Phillips
Carrie (2013) as OB Nurse (uncredited)
Cold Pursuit (2019) as The Eskimo
The Knight Before Christmas (2019) as Officer Stevens

Television
Must Be Santa (1999, TV Movie) as Floyd Court / Santa
The City (1999) as Tyrone Meeks
The War Next Door (2000) as Neil
Lord Have Mercy! (2003–2004) as Dwight Gooding
Twitches (2005, TV Movie) as David Barnes
Beautiful People (2005–2006) as Toby Sayles
Life with Derek (2005–2009) as Paul Greebie
Twitches Too (2007, TV Movie) as David Barnes
Billable Hours (2007–2008) as Vic Laghm
Stoked (2009) as Johnny
Grey's Anatomy (2010)
Lost Girl (2010) as Bertram
The Listener (2009–2011) as George Ryder
Combat Hospital (2011) as Commander Will Royal
Wingin' It (2011) as Artie Jackson
Air Farce Not the New Year's Eve Special (2012-2013)
Republic of Doyle (2013-2014) as Marco Long
A Day Late and a Dollar Short (2014, TV Movie) as Al
Beauty & The Beast (2014-2015) as Agent Thomas
Once Upon a Time (2016) as Poole
Travelers (2016) as Walt Forbes
PAW Patrol (2016-2019) as the Flight Controller
Altered Carbon as Hemmingway
The Expanse (2020) as Morris
The Parker Andersons/Amelia Parker (2021) as Tony Parker
The Porter

References

External links

Black Canadian male actors
Canadian male film actors
Canadian male television actors
British emigrants to Canada
Canadian male voice actors
Living people
Royal Canadian Air Farce
Male actors from Birmingham, West Midlands
1967 births